James McCurine Jr. (May 8, 1921 – May 24, 2002), nicknamed "Big Stick", was an American Negro league outfielder for the Chicago American Giants from 1946 to 1949.

A native of Clinton, Kentucky, McCurine's powerful hitting caught the eye of Chicago American Giants manager Candy Jim Taylor in a 1945 exhibition game. Taylor signed him, and McCurine and John "Mule" Miles became one of the top slugging duos in the Negro leagues. McCurine played for the Giants through 1949, and died in Chicago, Illinois in 2002 at age 81.

References

External links
 and Seamheads
 Jim McCurine at Negro League Baseball Players Association

1921 births
2002 deaths
Chicago American Giants players
20th-century African-American sportspeople
Baseball outfielders
21st-century African-American people
Sportspeople from Kentucky